Makhdoom Syed Faisal Saleh Hayat (born 1952 in Lahore) is a Pakistani politician from Jhang, Punjab and sports administrator. He is currently serving as the President of South Asian Football Federation (SAFF) and Vice-president of Asian Football Confederation (AFC).

Political career
He is the sijada nasheen (lineal descendant) of Peer Syed Mehboob Alam Shah, of Shah Jeewna. An agriculturist by profession, Makhdoom Syed Faisal Saleh Hayat holds a master's degree in law and a diploma in business administration from King's College London.

Makhdoom Syed Faisal Saleh Hayat was elected as Member of National Assembly of Pakistan for the terms of 1977–77, 1988–1990, 1990–1993, 1993–1996, 2002–2007 and 2008–2012.

In the 1990 election, his brother Asad Hayat was also elected member of National Assembly from NA86 Jhang.

Makhdoom Syed Faisal Saleh Hayat served as a member of Central Executive Committee of PPP in 1979. In 2002, he was elected MNA on PPP ticket, later forming PPP-Patriots and joining PML-Q. He served as Federal Minister in numerous Ministries which includes Commerce (1988–90), Environment, Housing and Works, Interior (2002–04), and Kashmir Affairs.

In 2013, his nomination papers were rejected on the charges of stealing irrigation water.

Hayat is currently the President of the Pakistan Football Federation and also serves as a member of the Strategic Committee of FIFA. He has held this position since 2003, and has been described as a "feudal lord of Pakistani football". During his controversial tenure, Pakistan's FIFA ranking has dropped from 168 in 2003 to 201 in 2017. In June 2017, 18 of the 26 members of the PFF voted in favor of Faisal Saleh Hayat's dismissal for incompetence and fund embezzlement. In July 2017, the FIFA threatened to suspend the PFF's membership if it kept refusing to hand football affairs to its president-elect Faisal Saleh Hayat.

In May 2017, Faisal Saleh Hayat was injured in a road accident near Faisalabad when his car was hit by a truck.

References

Interior ministers of Pakistan
Living people
1952 births
Aitchison College alumni
Alumni of King's College London
People from Jhang District
Pakistan People's Party MNAs
Pakistan Muslim League (Q) politicians
Pakistani MNAs 1977
Pakistani MNAs 1988–1990
Pakistani MNAs 1990–1993
Pakistani MNAs 1993–1996
Pakistani MNAs 2002–2007
Pakistani MNAs 2008–2013